is a former Japanese football player.

Club statistics

References

External links

1986 births
Living people
Hiroshima University of Economics alumni
Association football people from Hiroshima Prefecture
Japanese footballers
J2 League players
Sagan Tosu players
Oita Trinita players
Association football midfielders